Plăvăț is a district of Timișoara. Built in the last years of communism, the district is named after Ștefan Plavăț (1913–1944), a communist activist and leader of a resistance group active in southwestern Romania during World War II.

References 

Districts of Timișoara